Cyanea konahuanuiensis, known by the common name of Hāhā mili‘ohu (English: the Cyanea that is caressed by the mist), is a species of plant from the Ko‘olau Mountains of O‘ahu, Hawaiian Islands. It was described in 2015, and the wild population consists of approximately 20 mature plants. The species was assessed to be critically endangered in 2017.

Description
Cyanea konahuanuiensis is distinguished from all other species in the genus by having densely pubescent leaves, petioles, and flowers. The stems may be sparsely pubescent to glabrous, and it has long calyx lobes and a staminal column joined to the corolla.

It is named after Konahuanui, the mountain where it was discovered. It has been successfully germinated in an arboretum at the University of Hawaii.

References

Flora of Hawaii
Critically endangered flora of the United States
Cyanea (plant)